Georgia Apostolou (5 January 1973 – 12 June 2016)  was a Greek actress and fashion model. She was best known for starring in popular TV series such as Fili zois, Aliki (TV series)|Aliki, Pes to psemata and Erotas. She died on 12 June 2016 at the age of 43.

Selected filmography

Cinema
Zoe (1995)

Television
Anatomia enos egklimatos (1995)
To monopati tis agapis (1995)
Vammenos ilios (1996)
Karambola (1997)
Trikymia (1999)
Pes to psemata (2000)
Aliki (2001)
Fili zois (2002–2004)
Erotas (2005)

References

External links
 

1973 births
2016 deaths
Greek television actresses
Greek film actresses
Greek female models
Actresses from Athens
Models from Athens